Château Saint Georges (Côte Pavie) is a Bordeaux wine producer located on the Pavie hill (Côte Pavie) in Saint-Émilion. This  estate is located between Château Pavie and Château La Gaffelière.

References 

Châteaux in Gironde
Bordeaux wine producers